Alcides Mendoza Castro (March 14, 1928 – June 20, 2012) was the Catholic archbishop of the Archdiocese of Cuzco, Peru.

Ordained to the priesthood in 1951, he was named bishop in 1958 and in 1983 was named Archbishop of the Cuzco Archdiocese; he retired in 2003.

Notes

External links and additional sources
 (for Chronology of Bishops)
 (for Chronology of Bishops)

Peruvian Roman Catholic archbishops
1928 births
2012 deaths
Roman Catholic archbishops of Cusco
Roman Catholic bishops of Abancay